The church of Santa Maria delle Grazie al Trionfale is a church in Rome, in the Trionfale district, in Piazza Santa Maria delle Grazie.

History
The church was built by the architect and engineer  in the early forties; it is home parish, erected August 13, 1941 by the decree of the Cardinal Vicar Francesco Marchetti Selvaggiani "Beatissimae Virginis gratiarum", and he inherited the title of Santa Maria delle Grazie outside Porta Angelica, demolished in 1939 for the restructuring of Via di Porta Angelica.

List of Cardinal Priests
 Silvano Piovanelli 25 May 1985 - 9 July 2016
 Joseph William Tobin 19 November 2016 – present

References

External links
 Santa Maria delle Grazie 

Titular churches
Rome Q. XIV Trionfale
Roman Catholic churches completed in 1941
20th-century Roman Catholic church buildings in Italy